Glitterbug is the third major studio album by British rock band The Wombats. The album was produced by Mark Crew alongside the band themselves, and was released on the 13th of April 2015. The first single from the album, "Your Body Is a Weapon", was released on iTunes on the 2nd of October 2013 in the United Kingdom and the 3rd of December in the United States. This was followed by "Greek Tragedy", "Give Me a Try", "Be Your Shadow" and "Emoticons". To celebrate the album's release, the Glitterbug B Sides EP was released on the same day. The album entered the UK charts at #5 and reached #2 in Australia, as well as charting at #91 in the US, becoming the band's first to appear in the Billboard 200. The band supported the album with their Glitterbug Tour 2015.

Reception

Glitterbug has received mixed reviews from critics, with XFM describing it as "outstanding" and "full of wit, heart and huge singalong choruses". It has also been described as The Wombats' "finest album to date". Rolling Stone gave the album a positive review, singling out "The English Summer" and "Isabel" as "terrific". Renowned for Sound claims that The Wombats "don't step wrong once, with every song having a particular merit to it that makes it worth repeating again and again." Rebecca M. Williams of Exclaim! wrote that "while their approach is a little aggressive at times, making it a little too much to take in at once, Glitterbug is full of tracks that prove there's no reason not to indulge in it." However, Michael Hann from The Guardian described the album as "desperately un-involving."

Glitterbug was named one of the best 30 albums of 2015 by Radio X.

Track listing
All tracks written by Matthew Murphy. All tracks produced by Murphy, Dan Haggis, Tord Øverland Knudsen, and Mark Crew, except "Your Body Is A Weapon", produced by Murphy, Haggis, Knudsen, and Eric Valentine.

Personnel
Credits adapted from the album's liner notes.

 Matthew Murphy – lead vocals, guitars, keyboards, production
 Dan Haggis – drums, percussion, keyboards, guitars, backing vocals, production
 Tord Øverland Knudsen – bass guitar, keyboards, backing vocals, production
 Mark Crew – production and recording on all tracks except "Your Body Is a Weapon"
 Eric Valentine – production and recording on "Your Body Is a Weapon"
 Oliver Nelson – additional production on "This Is Not a Party"
 Manny Marroquin – audio mixing
 Stephen Marcussen – audio mastering
 Alex Gilbert – A&R
 Jeffrey P. Chang – A&R assistant
 Conor O'Mahony – coordination
 Storm Yeechong – coordination
 Samuel Burgess-Johnson – artwork
 Darren Oorloff – artwork
 Dan Priddy – recording assistant to Mark Crew
 Cian Riordan – recording assistant to Eric Valentine
 Chris Galland – mixing assistant
 Ike Schultz – mixing assistant
 Jeff Jackson – mixing assistant
 Willy Scooby – additional recording
 Zorg Albini – additional recording
 Jon Sagis – additional recording
 Darren Jones – recording assistant to Jon Sagis
 Robert Whitely – additional recording
 Justin Long – additional recording

Charts

Weekly charts

Year-end charts

Certifications

References

https://itunes.apple.com/us/album/glitterbug-deluxe-version/id955812139?ign-mpt=uo%3D2

The Wombats albums
2015 albums